Keeble v Hickeringill (1707) 103 ER 1127 is a famous English property law and tort law case about rights to wild animals.

Facts
Samuel Keeble (the plaintiff) owned property called Minott's Meadow, which contained a pond outfitted with nets and channels in a manner used to catch large numbers of commercially viable ducks. This type of pond served as a sort of "duck trap" and was known as a decoy. Tame ducks were used to lure their wild counterparts into the decoy.

On three occasions, defendant Edmund Hickeringill, while on his own land, discharged firearms toward Keeble's pond in order to scare away the ducks.

Judgment
Chief Justice Holt sustained the action of trespass on the case, because every person has the right to put his property to use for his own pleasure and profit. If Hickeringill had built a decoy on his own land near Keeble's meadow to draw away ducks (which, in fact, he had done previous to the construction of Keeble's own decoy and may have lent some cause as to Hickeringill's harassing actions), no action could be taken, because Hickeringill would have just as much right to set up a decoy on his own property as Keeble does on his. But, Hickeringill actively disturbed the ducks on Keeble's land, thereby causing damages in that,

Furthermore, Keeble had gone through the expense of setting up the decoy and nets, and to allow Hickeringill to disturb the profitable use of the land was bad for commerce. When a person hinders another's use of his own property for profit, it is actionable, even if there is no physical trespassing. Thus, Justice Holt concluded that

On appeal, made by Hickeringill the verdict was re-affirmed without any change. Keeble won a verdict of £20.

In the later House of Lords case of Allen v Flood, the Lords held that Keeble v Hickeringill was just a nuisance case, and not an economic torts case.

See also
 Pierson v. Post
 Ghen v. Rich
 Ratione soli

References

External links

 Excerpted version of case from a textbook by John Henry Wigmore from Google Books
Discussion of the case by A.W. Brian Simpson, also from Google Books

English tort case law
1707 in British law
1707 in England
English property case law
Lord Holt cases
Court of King's Bench (England) cases